Riverdale Park may refer to:

 Riverdale Park, California, a community in the United States
 Riverdale Park, a park in Riverdale, Bronx, New York City
 Riverdale Park, Maryland, a town in the United States
 Riverdale Park station, a light rail station under construction in Riverdale Park, Maryland
 Riverdale Park (Toronto), a park in Toronto, Canada